Statistics of National League A in the 2001–02 football season.

Nationalliga A
The Qualification Round to the League season 2001–02 was contested by twelve teams. The first eight teams of the regular season (or Qualification) were then to compete in the Championship Playoff Round. The teams in ninth to twelfth position completed with the top four teams of the Nationalliga B in a Nationalliga A/B Playoff round. At the end of the season FC Basel won the championship.

Regular season

Table

Results

Champion playoffs
The first eight teams of the regular season (or Qualification) competed in the Championship Playoff Round. They took half of the points (rounded up to complete units) gained in the Qualification as Bonus with them.

Table

Results

Nationalliga A/B Playoffs

Table

Results

Sources
RSSSF

Swiss Football League seasons
Swiss
1